The 1868 Democratic National Convention was held at Tammany Hall in New York City between July 4, and July 9, 1868. The first Democratic convention after the conclusion of the American Civil War, the convention was notable for the return of Democratic Party politicians from the Southern United States.

Venue

The convention was held at the new Tammany Hall building on East 14th Street in Manhattan, New York City, which replaced the organization's earlier headquarters. For the convention, the hall was elaborately decorated.

Convention officers
Horatio Seymour, the former governor of New York, served as the permanent chairman of the convention. Each state delegation had a vice president and secretary to the convention.

Henry L. Palmer of Wisconsin served as the convention's temporary chairman, after the convention voted on the opening day to appoint him after he was nominated by Democratic National Committee Chairman August Belmont.

Events of the convention
On July 4, 1868, coinciding with the first day of the Democratic National Convention, the Soldiers and Sailors National Convention was held at the Cooper Institute, also in New York City. On July 6, a committee from that convention was granted privilege to address the Democratic National Convention.

On July 6, an address from the Woman's Suffrage Association was presented and read before the convention.

During the convention, many delegates utilized the catch phrase, "this is a white man's country, let white men rule".

Presidential nomination

Presidential candidates 

The front-runner in the early balloting was George H. Pendleton, who led on the first 15 ballots, followed in varying order by incumbent president Andrew Johnson, Winfield Scott Hancock, Sanford Church, Asa Packer, Joel Parker, James E. English, James Rood Doolittle, and Thomas A. Hendricks. The unpopular Johnson, having narrowly survived impeachment, won 65 votes on the first ballot; the second-highest number of votes after Pendleton, but less than one-third of the total necessary for nomination, and he thus lost his bid for election as president in his own right. His vote tally rapidly dropped away thereafter, and from the eighth ballot onwards, he would only receive votes from his home state of Tennessee.

Meanwhile, the convention chairman Horatio Seymour, former governor of New York, received 9 votes on the fourth ballot from the state of North Carolina. This unexpected move caused "loud and enthusiastic cheering," but Seymour refused, saying,
I must not be nominated by this Convention, as I could not accept the nomination if tendered. My own inclination prompted me to decline at the outset; my honor compels me to do so now. It is impossible, consistently with my position, to allow my name to be mentioned in this Convention against my protest. The clerk will proceed with the call.

After numerous indecisive ballots, the names of John T. Hoffman, Francis P. Blair, and Stephen Johnson Field were placed in nomination. This raised the number of names placed into nomination to thirteen. None of these new candidates, however, gained much traction.

For twenty-one ballots, the opposing candidates battled it out: the East battling the West for control, the conservatives battling the radicals. The two leading candidates were determined that the other should not receive the nomination; because of the two-thirds rule of the convention, a compromise candidate was needed. Seymour still hoped it would be Chief Justice Salmon P. Chase, but on the twenty-second ballot, the chairman of the Ohio delegation announced, "at the unanimous request and demand of the delegation I place Horatio Seymour in nomination with twenty-one votes-against his inclination, but no longer against his honor."

Seymour had to wait for the rousing cheers to die down before he could address the delegates and decline.
I have no terms in which to tell of my regret that my name has been brought before this convention. God knows that my life and all that I value most in life I would give for the good of my country, which I believe to be identified with that of the Democratic party...

"Take the nomination, then!" cried someone from the floor.

...but when I said that I could not be a candidate, I meant it! I could not receive the nomination without placing not only myself but the Democratic party in a false position. God bless you for your kindness to me, but your candidate I cannot be.Official proceedings of the National Democratic convention, held at New York, July 4-9, 1868 (Pg. 153)

Seymour left the platform to cool off and rest. No sooner had he left the hall than former representative Clement Vallandigham, a member of the Ohio delegation and one-time ally of Seymour, rose and proclaimed that the delegation would not accept Seymour's refusal, and that he was the only man who could break the deadlock at the convention, much less win the presidency. The chairman of New York's delegation then stood and, while bound by the convention rules not to switch its votes (which it had already cast for Hendricks) until the round of balloting had concluded, made a passionate speech in support of Seymour. The roll call continued, with Seymour only picking up one additional vote (from Tennessee), but the final state, Wisconsin, cast a blank ballot which it then immediately switched to Seymour. This started a stampede with all the remaining states quickly throwing their support behind Seymour, eventually leading to his being nominated unanimously.

In 1868, the States of Arkansas, Alabama, Florida, North Carolina, South Carolina, Georgia, and Louisiana were readmitted to the Union. Nebraska had been admitted to the Union on March 1, 1867. Texas, Mississippi and Virginia had not yet been readmitted to the Union.

Balloting

1st Day of Presidential Balloting / 3rd Day of Convention (July 7, 1868)

2nd Day of Presidential Balloting / 4th Day of Convention (July 8, 1868)

3rd Day of Presidential Balloting / 5th Day of Convention (July 9, 1868)

Vice Presidential nomination

Vice Presidential candidate 

Exhausted, the delegates unanimously nominated General Francis Preston Blair Jr. for vice-president on the first ballot after the names of Augustus C. Dodge and Thomas Ewing Jr. were withdrawn from consideration. Blair's nomination reflected a desire to balance the ticket east and west as well as north and south.

Blair had worked hard to acquire the Democratic nomination and accepted second place on the ticket, finding himself in controversy. Blair had gained attention by an inflammatory letter addressed to Colonel James O. Broadhead, dated a few days before the convention met. In his letter, Blair wrote that the "real and only issue in this contest was the overthrow of Reconstruction, as the radical Republicans had forced it in the South."

See also 
 History of the United States Democratic Party
 List of Democratic National Conventions
 U.S. presidential nomination convention
 1868 Republican National Convention
 1868 United States presidential election

References

Bibliography 
 Coleman, Charles Hubert. The election of 1868 : the Democratic effort to regain control (1933) online

Primary sources 
 Chester, Edward W A guide to political platforms (1977) pp 86–89 online
 Official proceedings of the National Democratic convention, held at New York, July 4-9, 1868

External links 
 Democratic Party Platform of 1868 at The American Presidency Project

1868 conferences
1868 United States presidential election
1868 in New York (state)
1860s in New York City
19th century in Manhattan
Political conventions in New York City
New York State Democratic Committee
Political events in New York (state)
Democratic National Conventions
July 1868 events